CL2 may refer to:
 Chlorine gas, Cl2
 CAS latency 2, a rating of computer memory
 Google Calendar, a time-management web application (from a URL fragment used in early versions)
 Only Built 4 Cuban Linx II, a musical album by American hip-hop artist Raekwon
 Class 2 rated cables, in the National Electrical Code
 LPHN2, a human gene that encodes the Latrophilin-2 protein